Ignacio is a masculine given name. It may also refer to:

Surname
 Arnell Ignacio (born 1964), Filipino game show host, comedian, actor and singer-songwriter
 Dion Ignacio (born 1986), Filipino actor
 Louie Ignacio (born 1968), Filipino television director
 Raily Ignacio (born 1987), Curaçaoan footballer

Places
 Ignacio, California, United States, an unincorporated community
 Ignacio, Colorado, United States, a Statutory Town

Other uses
 Hurricane Ignacio (disambiguation), seven tropical cyclones of the eastern Pacific Ocean
 Ignacio (English title: Do You Hear the Dogs Barking?), a 1975 Mexican drama film